This page article documents the acting roles of television and film as well as video game appearances of Australian singer-actress Kylie Minogue.

Films

Television

Videogames

Awards and nominations

See also

 Kylie Minogue videography
 Kylie Minogue albums discography
 Kylie Minogue singles discography
 List of songs recorded by Kylie Minogue
 Kylie Minogue products
 List of Kylie Minogue concert tours
 List of awards and nominations received by Kylie Minogue

References

External links
 
 

Films
Actress filmographies
Australian filmographies